The Wagner Lakes are lakes located  on Vancouver Island at the south end of the Forbidden Plateau.

See also
List of lakes of British Columbia

References

Comox Valley
Lakes of Vancouver Island
Nelson Land District